The Patapsco class of  gasoline tankers were a class of tankers built for the United States Navy during World War II. The class consisted of 23 tankers, designated AOG-1 through AOG-11, and AOG-48 to AOG-59. They served through the Korean War and several served in foreign navies.

Production
Many were built as Maritime Commission type T1-MT-M1 tanker hull, under a Maritime Commission contract, at Cargill, Inc., Savage, Minnesota.

Propulsion
Four  Cleveland Diesel Engine Division 12-278A diesel-electric engines, single main reduction gears, two propellers, for a total .

Service
Various ships in the class served from World War II through the Vietnam War in various campaigns. Some were transferred to the Greek Navy and Taiwan. The last ones in U.S. service were decommissioned in July 1975. Taiwan decommissioned the last one, ROCS Chang Pei (AOG-517), in 2005.

Patapsco was converted into a fishing trawler after its naval service and renamed Arctic Storm. As of 2019 it is still active, and the only known surviving member of its class.

Ships
 Seattle-Tacoma Shipbuilding Corporation
 
 
 
 
 
 Cargill

References 

 

Auxiliary ship classes of the United States Navy
 
 Patapsco
 Patapsco
 Patapsco
 Patapsco
Auxiliary transport ship classes